Generation Ami (stylised as: Generation আমি) is a 2018 Bengali drama film directed by Mainak Bhaumik, which stars Rwitobroto Mukherjee and Sauraseni Maitra in lead roles. The film was produced under the banner of Shree Venkatesh Films

Plot
This is the story of a teenager Apu, a tenth grade student who will be appearing for his boards. He writes lyrics for his music at his leisure, has a burning passion for the guitar. He cannot unleash the spark he has got within, for his family would not allow him to. 
One fine day his cousin Durga comes from Delhi for a brief stay with his family in Kolkata, until her checkup with a psychiatrist is done with. She is charming, rebellious, enigmatic and supportive towards Apu and his aspirations.
Sounds very monotonous and simple for a plot right? We forgot its Kolkata- a city of lost love, and stories lost in time. Remember Pather Panchali, how Apu looked up to Durga, the undying faith, comfort he found in him. Here Durga comes like the 'Sharodatsav' or Durga Puja in Apu's life, never staying long enough- but nevertheless the stay, the aura, the adoration leaves him scarred. Durga brought with her memories to cherish forever, to look back at, and reassure himself that he had found that special someone.
 Durga is lost in her own personal troubles, sorting her distorted, unrequited love for a much older man, deciphering the worth of her relationships and commitments. Her family foundation is at stake, her parents not having enough time for her ever and on the verge of breaking apart into a divorce. She quits taking her pills for depression, without anyone coming to know about this, until it is but too late.
Apu unknowingly falls for her, in the sweet-sour bond of love, friendship, and promises. Apu tries to get her back on track, ensure her medications and checkups properly, try understand her; but could not see into Durga well enough. Durga confided in herself, a lot more that what Apu could ever come to know. By the time Apu could even realize that Durga had become such integral a part of him, Durga leaves.
Its the autumn bidding goodbye for bleak, cold winter to dawn in. Apu-Durga can never be complete without one another, as we have seen since Pather Panchali times. Apu never can fill up the void within, the special place he had for Durga, not even knowing she meant something to him.
The movie closes off, with Apu singing-
"Kal sara raat 
bhebe dekhechi
kal sara raat 
ami onek ghure bari phirechi"
Apu would find Durga in his music, in balloons by the bridge, in every stroke of his guitar; everytime he cherishes his freedom, he lives his life like he dreamt of, he would know Durga is there, maybe somewhere far but she would be cheering for him, and a faint whisper in the air, saying- "Haal cherona bondhu".

Cast
 Rwitobroto Mukherjee as Arunava Bose aka Apu, Durga's cousin
 Sauraseni Maitra as  Sreoshi Bose aka Durga, Apu's cousin
 Aparajita Auddy as Khuku, Apu's mother
 Shantilal Mukherjee as Apu's father
 Lily Chakravarty as Apu and Durga's grandmother
 Anusha Vishwanathan as Piya, Apu's friend and love interest
 Abhirup Chakrabarti as Apu's friend
 Pushan Dasgupta as Apu's friend
 Agnibha Mukherjee as Apu's friend
 Nandini Chatterjee as Durga's mother
 Indrajit Deb as Durga's father

Soundtrack

Release 
The film released on 23 November 2018. It was well received by the audience and critics alike. It performed moderately well at the box office. It remained the top-reigning film in its opening week.

References

External links
 

Bengali-language Indian films
2010s Bengali-language films
2018 films
Indian drama films
Indian teen films
Films scored by Arindam Chatterjee
Indian teen drama films